The women's long jump event at the 1991 Pan American Games was held in Havana, Cuba.

Results

References

Athletics at the 1991 Pan American Games
1991
Pan